Gemerské Teplice is a village and municipality in Revúca District in the Banská Bystrica Region of Slovakia.

History
It arose in 1964 for the union of Gemerský Milhost' and Jelšavská Teplica in a unique Municipality. Gemerský Milhost' merged in the History in 1258 (1258 Polgla, 1383 Myglezpathuka, 1427 Myglizpataka). It belonged, in the order, to Zachy, Mèchy and Sáhgy noble families. In 1555 it was pillaged by Turks. Jelšavská Teplica, still, was first mentioned in 1258 (Thapolcha). In that time, it belonged to a certain Peter, Kačič Elias'son, and after to Jelšava and Muráň. It suffered because of Turks in 1556. From 1938 to 1945, both the villages were annexed by Hungary.

Genealogical resources

The records for genealogical research are available at the state archive "Statny Archiv in Kosice, Slovakia"

 Roman Catholic church records (births/marriages/deaths): 1779-1898 (parish B)
 Greek Catholic church records (births/marriages/deaths): 1775-1928 (parish B)
 Lutheran church records (births/marriages/deaths): 1784-1913 (parish B)

See also
 List of municipalities and towns in Slovakia

References

External links
 
 
Surnames of living people in Gemerske Teplice

Villages and municipalities in Revúca District